Codringtonia parnassia is a species of air-breathing land snail, a terrestrial pulmonate gastropod mollusc in the family Helicidae, the typical snails.

Geographic distribution
C. parnassia is endemic to Greece, where it occurs in the central part of the country.

References

Codringtonia
Molluscs of Europe
Endemic fauna of Greece
Gastropods described in 1855